Stanislovas Vitkovskis (born 1967) is a retired Lithuanian international football midfielder. He obtained a total number of two caps for the Lithuania national football team, scoring one goal. During his professional career he played only for his native Lithuania.

Honours
 Baltic Cup
 Baltic Cup 1991

External links

Profile at KLISF

1967 births
Living people
Lithuanian footballers
Lithuania international footballers
Association football midfielders